Michael Nathanson is an American actor, known for roles such as Sam Stein in Marvel's The Punisher, and Dr. Levi Zinberg in The Knick.

Career
Michael Nathanson grew up in New York.  He studied at Northwestern University, but returned to New York because "so much of the work has come back to New York." He had briefly worked as a bartender at a friend's bar to earn some income on the side. He joined the cast of The Punisher which is set in the Marvel Cinematic Universe.

Personal life
In 2008, he married Hayley Elizabeth Ehrlich. They have twin daughters together.

Filmography

References

External links 

21st-century American male actors
American male film actors
American male television actors
Living people
Male actors from Chicago
Male actors from Los Angeles
Male actors from New York City
Northwestern University alumni
Year of birth missing (living people)